Reidar Lorentzen (born 22 September 1956) is a Norwegian javelin thrower. He was born in Hammerfest, and represented the club IK Tjalve. He competed at the 1984 Summer Olympics in Los Angeles.

References

External links 
 

1956 births
Living people
People from Hammerfest
Norwegian male javelin throwers
Olympic athletes of Norway
Athletes (track and field) at the 1984 Summer Olympics
Sportspeople from Troms og Finnmark